Cyclin-dependent kinases regulatory subunit 1 is a protein that in humans is encoded by the CKS1B gene.

Function 

The CKS1B protein binds to the catalytic subunit of the cyclin-dependent kinases and is essential for their biological function. The CKS1B mRNA is found to be expressed in different patterns through the cell cycle in HeLa cells, which reflects a specialized role for the encoded protein.

CKS1B and CKS2 proteins have demonstrated principal roles in cell cycle regulation. Defined originally as suppressors of mutations in both fission and budding yeast Cdk1 genes, Cks molecules interact with Cdk1, Cdk2 and Cdk3. These Cdk-dependent enzyme complexes in cell cycle regulation frequently consist of Cdk molecules bound to a catalytic Cdk subunit, i.e. Cks and a regulatory cyclin subunit, such as a G1 cyclin, controlling Cdk function by directing cyclin-cdk complex activity toward specific and significant substrates. Malfunctions of cdk-dependent associations lead to defects into the entry of mitosis for cells.

Cks1 in the Cdk-independent pathway involves the recognition of substrates p27Kip1 and p21cip1 by directly associating with E3 SCFSkp2 when stimulated by certainmitogenic signals, such as TGF-β.

Clinical significance 

Cks1-depleted breast cancer cells not only exhibit slowed G(1) progression, but also accumulate in G(2)-M due to blocked mitotic entry. Cdk1 expression, which is crucial for M phase entry, is drastically diminished by Cks1 depletion, and that restoration of cdk1 reduces G(2)-M accumulation in Cks1-depleted cells.

Interactions 

CKS1B has been shown to interact with SKP2 and CDKN1B.

References

External links

Further reading 

Cell cycle regulators